Essak Khumari (Urdu: عیسک خماری) is a village of Karak District, Khyber Pakhtunkhwa, Pakistan located at an altitude of . It is 8 kilometers (5 miles) from union council Teri, Khyber Pakhtunkhwa

Populated places in Karak District
Karak District